McCormick-Stillman Railroad Park is a  railroad park located in Scottsdale, Arizona It features a  gauge railroad, a Magma Arizona Railroad locomotive, a railroad museum, three model railroad clubs and a  gauge live steam railroad.

History
In 1967, the Fowler McCormicks donated  of McCormick Ranch to the City of Scottsdale stipulating that it be used as a park for all people to enjoy. The son of Anne and James Stillman, Guy Stillman, assembled his  gauge narrow gauge railroad replica in the property. He called it the "Paradise & Pacific Railroad" and was offered to the city in 1971. The U.S. Marines, with the backing of Senator Barry Goldwater, contributed to the railroad's expansion by supplying manpower for the laying of tracks. The park officially opened on October 4, 1975. Originally named McCormick Railroad Park, it was renamed McCormick-Stillman Railroad Park in 1996 in recognition of its founder, Guy Stillman. 

The City of Scottsdale sold  of the donated land to a developer several years ago.

Attractions

 Paradise & Pacific Railroad: Created by Stillman, the Paradise & Pacific Railroad is the oldest and the first attraction to operate in the park. The railroad has three steam locomotives (two operational), three diesel locomotives, two cabooses, a coach car, a trolley car (in the model RR building), three stock cars and a large number of gondola cars.
 Charro Carrousel: This merry-go-round was built in 1950 by The Allan Herschell Company and was purchased and restored by the Scottsdale Railroad & Mechanical Society.
 Playgrounds: The park has two children's playgrounds, one of them Southwestern-themed in an adobe construction.
 Statue of Bil Keane: Mr Keane was the creator of the newspaper comic The Family Circus.

Exhibits
 
 Magma Arizona Railroad Engine #6: This locomotive was built in 1907 by the Baldwin Locomotive Works and operated in the Magma Arizona Railroad for 54 years. It was purchased by the Scottsdale Railroad & Mechanical Society in 1977 and is the only Arizona & New Mexico engine remaining in Arizona.
 Railroad Museum
 Roald Amundsen Pullman car: Donated to the Scottsdale Railroad and Mechanical Society by Mr. and Mrs. Franz Talley, it is one of six cars built by the Pullman Company in 1928. It was constructed at a cost of $205,000 and used by Presidents Herbert Hoover, Franklin Roosevelt, Harry Truman, and Dwight Eisenhower. President Eisenhower used the car exclusively during the whistle-stop campaign in 1952. It was on this car on August 18, 1940, that President Roosevelt and Canadian Prime Minister W.L. McKenzie King met and mutually agreed to the Ogdensberg Declaration, a declaration that provided for the joint defense of North America in the event of foreign invasion. That was the beginning of the North American Air Defense, also known as N.O.R.A.D. It was donated to the park in 1971.
 The Swiss Railway Clock: The clock was donated to the McCormick-Stillman Railroad Park by the City of Interlaken, Switzerland. This was done in commemoration of the sister cities partnership of the cities of Interlaken and Scottsdale. The Swiss Railway Clock was designed in 1944 by Hans Hilfiker and was used by the Swiss federal Railways as a station clock.
 Gabe Brooks Machine Shop: Built in 1930 by Gabe Brooks, who was considered the finest machinist in the United States during World War II. It still contains original machining equipment.
 Navajo Hogans: These are two of the only three Indian hogans that exist off the Northern Arizona Navajo Indian Reservation. The other hogan is located at the Heard Museum in Phoenix, Arizona.
 Xeriscape Arboretum: This desert arboretum has been growing since 1980 and has different species of plants from different regions.
 The Antique Railroad Bell: This bell was presented to Henry S. Sturgis in 1958. Mr. Sturgis was the vice president of the First National Bank who played an active part in railroad finances. He served as chairman of the executive committee of the Erie Railroad.

Railroad clubs

Scottsdale Live Steamers: The Scottsdale Live Steamers is a  gauge miniature railroad which surrounds the Xeriscape Arboretum and was the former home of the Maricopa Live Steamers. The layout has two main loops: the outer loop passes over the tunnel and the inner through it.

The following three railroad clubs are housed in the McCormick Ranch Bunkhouse:
 Scottsdale Model Railroad Historical Society: This club features a HO scale model train layout.
 Paradise & Pacific Tinplate Club: This club features an O scale model train layout.
 Sun-N Sand Club: This club features an N scale model train layout.

Gallery of Attractions

See also

 Adobe Mountain Desert Railroad Park
 List of heritage railroads in the United States

References

External links
 Official Website

Economy of Scottsdale, Arizona
Tourist attractions in Scottsdale, Arizona
Parks in Maricopa County, Arizona
Museums in Scottsdale, Arizona
Arboreta in Arizona
Railroad museums in Arizona
Buildings and structures in Scottsdale, Arizona
Protected areas established in 1967
1967 establishments in Arizona
Model railway shows and exhibitions
7½ in gauge railways